Staňkov is a municipality and village in Jindřichův Hradec District in the South Bohemian Region of the Czech Republic. It has about 200 inhabitants. 

It lies along the border with Austria.

References

Villages in Jindřichův Hradec District